Alva Stewart (October 21, 1821 - December 31, 1889) was a member of the Wisconsin State Assembly and the Wisconsin State Senate.

Biography
Stewart was born on October 21, 1821, in Morrisonville, New York. He died on December 31, 1889.

Career
Stewart was a member of the Assembly in 1850. He represented the 12th District of the Senate in 1852 and the 14th District in 1853. From 1864 to 1889, Stewart was a Wisconsin Circuit Court judge. He was a member of the Whig Party.

References

People from Clinton County, New York
People from Jefferson County, Wisconsin
Wisconsin state senators
Members of the Wisconsin State Assembly
Wisconsin state court judges
Wisconsin Whigs
19th-century American politicians
1821 births
1889 deaths
19th-century American judges